A. japonicus may refer to:
Acetes japonicus, a shrimp species
Achaeus japonicus, the orang-utan crab
Aedes japonicus, a mosquito species
Analipus japonicus, a brown alga species
Apostichopus japonicus, a sea cucumber species
Argyrosomus japonicus, the mulloway, jewfish or dusky kob, a fish species found in coastal waters surrounding Australia, Africa, India, Pakistan, China, Korea and Japan

See also